Rogova is a commune located in Mehedinți County, Oltenia, Romania. It is composed of two villages, Poroinița and Rogova.

References

Communes in Mehedinți County
Localities in Oltenia
Place names of Slavic origin in Romania